Ap Lei Chau Estate is one of the 17 constituencies in the Southern District, Hong Kong. The constituency returns one district councillor to the Southern District Council, with an election every four years.

Ap Lei Chau Estate constituency has an estimated population of 13,210.

Councillors represented

Election results

2010s

2000s

1990s

References

Constituencies of Hong Kong
Constituencies of Southern District Council
1994 establishments in Hong Kong
Constituencies established in 1994